8th SLGFCA Awards
December 12, 2011

Best Film: 
The Artist

Best Director: 
Michel Hazanavicius
The Artist
The nominees for the 8th St. Louis Film Critics Association Awards were announced on December 12, 2011.

Winners and nominees

Best Actor
George Clooney – The Descendants as Matt King
Jean Dujardin – The Artist as George Valentin
Michael Fassbender – Shame as Brandon Sullivan
Ryan Gosling – Drive as The Driver (Runner-up)
Gary Oldman – Tinker Tailor Soldier Spy as George Smiley
Brad Pitt – Moneyball as Billy Beane

Best Actress
Rooney Mara – The Girl with the Dragon Tattoo as Lisbeth Salander
Viola Davis – The Help as Aibileen Clarke
Elizabeth Olsen – Martha Marcy May Marlene as Martha
Saoirse Ronan – Hanna as Hanna
Meryl Streep – The Iron Lady as Margaret Thatcher (Runners-up)
Michelle Williams – My Week with Marilyn as Marilyn Monroe (Runners-up)

Best Animated Film
The Adventures of Tintin: The Secret of the Unicorn
Kung Fu Panda 2
Puss in Boots
Rango (Runner-up)
Rio

Best Cinematography
The Artist – Guillaume Schiffman
Drive – Newton Thomas Sigel
The Girl with the Dragon Tattoo – Jeff Cronenweth (Runners-up)
The Tree of Life – Emmanuel LubezkiWar Horse – Janusz Kamiński (Runners-up)

Best DirectorMichel Hazanavicius – The Artist
David Fincher – The Girl with the Dragon Tattoo
Terrence Malick – The Tree of Life (Runner-up)
Alexander Payne – The Descendants
Nicolas Winding Refn – Drive

Best Documentary Film
Being Elmo: A Puppeteer's Journey
Buck
Conan O'Brien Can't Stop
The Interrupters
Tabloid (Runner-up)

Best Film
The Artist
The Descendants (Runner-up)
Drive
My Week with Marilyn
The Tree of Life

Best Comedy
Bridesmaids
Crazy, Stupid, Love
Midnight in Paris (Runner-up)
The Muppets
Paul
Rango

Best Foreign Language Film
13 Assassins (Jūsannin no Shikaku) • JapanI Saw the Devil (Akmareul boattda) • South Korea
Point Blank (À bout portant) • France
Trollhunter (Trolljegeren) • Norway
Winter in Wartime (Oorlogswinter) • Netherlands (Runner-up)

Best MusicThe Artist
Drive (Runner-up)
The Girl with the Dragon Tattoo
The Muppets
The Tree of Life

Best Original Screenplay
The Artist – Michel Hazanavicius50/50 – Will Reiser (Runner-up)
Hanna – Seth Lochhead and David Farr
Midnight in Paris – Woody Allen
The Tree of Life – Terrence Malick
Win Win – Tom McCarthy and Joe Tiboni

Best Adapted ScreenplayThe Descendants – Nat Faxon, Jim Rash and Alexander PayneDrive – Hossein Amini
The Help – Tate Taylor
Moneyball – Steven Zaillian and Aaron Sorkin (Runner-up)
The Muppets – Jason Segel and Nicholas Stoller

Best Supporting ActorAlbert Brooks – Drive as Bernie RoseJohn Goodman – The Artist as Al Zimmer
John Hawkes – Martha Marcy May Marlene as Patrick
Jonah Hill – Moneyball as Peter Brand
Alan Rickman – Harry Potter and the Deathly Hallows – Part 2 as Severus Snape (Runner-up)

Best Supporting ActressBérénice Bejo – The Artist as Peppy MillerCate Blanchett – Hanna as Marissa
Jessica Chastain – The Tree of Life as Mrs. O'Brien
Octavia Spencer – The Help as Minny Jackson (Runners-up)
Shailene Woodley – The Descendants as Alexandra King (Runners-up)

Best Visual Effects
Captain America: The First AvengerHarry Potter and the Deathly Hallows – Part 2
Rise of the Planet of the Apes (Runner-up)
Super 8
The Tree of Life

Best Art-House or Festival Film
Beginners
Martha Marcy May Marlene
Tucker & Dale vs Evil
We Need to Talk About Kevin
Win Win (Runner-up)

Best Scene (favorite movie scene or sequence)
The Artist: dance scene finale (Runner-up)
Drive: the elevator beating scene
Drive: opening get-away scene
The Girl with the Dragon Tattoo: opening credits
Hanna: Hanna’s escape from captivity sequence
Melancholia: the last scene

References
 St Louis Film Critics AwardsDaily

External links
 Official website

2011
2011 film awards
2011 in Missouri
December 2011 events in the United States
St Louis

fr:7e cérémonie des St. Louis Film Critics Association Awards